Stig Axel Folke Ström (15 October 1907 – 20 January 1996) was a Swedish religious studies scholar who specialized in the study of Germanic religion.

Biography
Folke Ström was born in Eskilstuna, Sweden on 15 October 1907. the son of politician Fredrik Ström and author Tua Ström. He grew up in Stockholm. After graduating from high school, Ström studied ethnography, Nordic languages and religious history at Stockholm University. He gained his B.A. in 1936, and his Ph.D. in 1942. His doctoral thesis, On the Sacred Origin of the Germanic Death Penalties (1942). Ström's thesis was praised upon publication, and he was appointed a docent at Stockholm University in 1943. He was offered the position of professor at Lund University in 1943, but decided to continue his work at Stockholm. Since 1948, Ström was docent at the University of Gothenburg. 

Ström specialized in the study of Germanic religion, particularly Old Norse religion. He wrote numerous influential studies on this subjects.

Ström retired in 1972. Ström died in Gothenburg, Sweden on 20 January 1996.

Selected works
 On  the  Sacral  Origin  of  the  Germanic Death Penalties, 1942
 Den döendes makt och Odin i trädet, 1947
 Den egna kraftens män. En studie i forntida irreligiositet, 1948
 Diser, nornor, valkyrjor. Fruktbarhetskult och sakralt kungadöme i Norden, 1954
 Loki. Ein mythologisches problem, 1956
 Nordisk hedendom: tro och sed i förkristen tid, 1961

See also
 Åke V. Ström
 Dag Strömbäck
 Geo Widengren
 Stig Wikander
 Anders Hultgård

Sources

 

1907 births
1996 deaths
Germanic studies scholars
Academic staff of Lund University
Old Norse studies scholars
Stockholm University alumni
Academic staff of Stockholm University
Writers on Germanic paganism
Members of the Royal Gustavus Adolphus Academy